Daniel Salomon (born January 27, 1957) is a Republican member of the Montana Senate, where he represents Senate District 47 which represents the Ronan, Montana, area. He served in the Montana House of Representatives from 2011 to 2017.

See also 
 Montana House of Representatives, District 12

References

Living people
1957 births
Republican Party members of the Montana House of Representatives
Montana State University alumni
People from Ronan, Montana
Farmers from Montana
21st-century American politicians